Ice Merchants is a 2022 animated short film directed by João Gonzalez. The 14-minute short about family love is the first ever Portuguese animation to be awarded at the Cannes Film Festival, where it premiered as part of the 2022 International Critics' Week (Semaine de la Critique). The film has been featured in a number of international film festivals, receiving accolades such as the Gold Hugo award for Best Animated Short at the Chicago International Film Festival and won over nine awards in festivals and a nomination for the 95th Academy Awards in the category of Best Animated Short Film.

Plot 
Every day, a father and his son jump with a parachute from their house on a cliff to go to the village, where they sell ice. While falling, they always lose their matching hats, and the father buys them new ones while in town. They then return to their house through the use of a pulley system, where they spend time together and bond. The boy's mother has passed away some time ago, but her presence is still on the mind of the father and son, whether by her unused mug or her empty space in the bed.

One morning, the temperature is so warm that there is no ice to sell, and melting snow falls heavily on the house, breaking it away from the cliff. The backpack with the parachute falls away, leaving the father and son stranded. Realizing that they have no chance for survival, the father holds the son tightly and jumps from the collapsing house. On the way down, they are met by a vision of the mother, who holds on to the pair and pulls her own parachute.

The father and son miraculously land on the massive pile of hats that have accumulated on the forest floor below the house and are saved. They walk off to the village, taking a hat for the son along the way.

Reception 
Since its release, the film has been selected in various festivals around the world:

References

External links 
 Official trailer on YouTube
 Ice Merchants on IMDb
 Ice Merchants on Unifrance
 Ice Merchants at Canne's Critics' Week

2022 animated films
2022 films
2022 short films
Best Animated Short Subject Annie Award winners
British animated short films
French animated short films
Portuguese animated short films
Films about father–son relationships
Skydiving in fiction